Gabriel Lima Oliveira (born 4 July 1990), known as Gabriel Pimba, is a Brazilian footballer who plays as a midfielder.

Club career
Gabriel Pimba began his career at Atlético Paranaense, scoring once in 15 games at the club over 6 years, during which time he went on loan to several clubs in Brazil in Japan. After leaving Paranaense, he played in the lower leagues in Brazil and in Spain for Jove Español, before joining Gibraltar Premier Division team Gibraltar Phoenix in summer 2018. He made his debut for Phoenix on 25 August 2018, against Europa.

International career
Gabriel Pimba has 5 caps for the Brazil national under-20 football team, scoring three goals.

References

External links

Gabriel Pimba at playmakerstats.com (English version of ogol.com.br)

1990 births
Living people
Brazilian footballers
Brazilian expatriate footballers
Expatriate footballers in Japan
Gibraltar Phoenix F.C. players
J2 League players
Ventforet Kofu players
Association football midfielders